The 2011 Boys' Youth Pan-American Volleyball Cup was the first edition of the annual men's volleyball tournament, played by six countries from July 9–17, 2011 in Mexicali, Mexico.

Competing Nations

Preliminary round

Group A

Group B

Final round

Championship bracket

Quarterfinals

Semifinals

Fifth place match

Bronze medal match

Final

Final standing

Individual awards

Most Valuable Player

Best Scorer

Best Spiker

Best Blocker

Best Server

Best Digger

Best Setter

Best Receiver

Best Libero

References

External links
 

Men's Pan-American Volleyball Cup
P
V
Volleyball